Modesto Cid (25 March 1879 – 5 July 1954) was a Spanish film actor. He appeared in 67 films between 1933 and 1954.

Selected filmography

 The Wildcat (1936)
 Gentleman Thief (1946)
 When the Angels Sleep (1947)
 Unexpected Conflict (1948)
 The Drummer of Bruch (1948)
 That Luzmela Girl (1949)
 Apartado de correos 1001 (1950)
 The Honesty of the Lock (1950)
 The Vila Family (1950)
 Child of the Night (1950)
 My Beloved Juan (1950)
 Nobody's Wife (1950)
 Fog and Sun (1951)
 Doubt (1951)
 I Want to Marry You (1951)
 The King's Mail (1951)
 La Virgen gitana (1951)
 María Morena (1951)
 Forbidden Trade (1952)
 Spanish Fantasy (1953)
 The Louts (1954)
 Father Cigarette (1955)

External links

1879 births
1954 deaths
Spanish male film actors
20th-century Spanish male actors